The election of all four representatives was contested, but the records that explained the precise grounds on which the election was contested have been lost due to the burning of Washington in the War of 1812. It is known to have related to questions of regularity and procedure. All four representatives' elections were ruled valid.

See also 
 United States House of Representatives elections, 1788 and 1789
 List of United States representatives from New Jersey

References 

1789
New Jersey
United States House of Representatives